Zinc finger protein 101 is a protein that in humans is encoded by the ZNF101 gene.

Function

Zinc finger proteins (ZNFs), such as ZNF101, bind nucleic acids and perform many key functions, the most important of which is regulating transcription (summary by Bellefroid et al., 1993 [PubMed 8467795]). See ZNF91 (MIM 603971) for general information on ZNFs.

References

Further reading 

Human proteins